No Regrets – The Best of Scott Walker and The Walker Brothers 1965–1976 is a compilation album by the American pop group The Walker Brothers and the singer-songwriter Scott Walker.

It was released in 1992 and reached number four on the UK Albums Chart.

Track listing
All tracks performed by The Walker Brothers, except where indicated.

References

Scott Walker (singer) albums
The Walker Brothers albums
1992 compilation albums
Albums produced by Johnny Franz
Albums produced by Nick Venet
Fontana Records compilation albums